Anna Demidova (born April 23, 1988) is a Russian-American professional ballroom dancer, actress and model. She is the winner of the professional dancer competition of Dancing with the Stars, Season 8, which guaranteed her a spot as a professional dancer in Season 9 and has been featured in many popular magazines worldwide. Anna is the sister of World Ballroom Dance Champion Katusha Demidova.

Early life 
Demidova was born in Moscow, Russian SFSR, Soviet Union. She started dancing when she was just 6 years old in an after school program at the local community center, following in the footsteps of her older sister, world champion Katusha Demidova. At the age of fifteen Demidova won the British Open Junior Ballroom Championship and the Ireland Open Championship.

Career 
After finishing high school in Moscow, Demidova moved to New York to live with her sister and pursue her dancing career. She began dancing with Andrei Begunov. After becoming the United States Youth Champions in 2005 and 2006, they represented the U.S. at the World Championships where they made the finals. They also placed 1st at the Ohio Star Ball, Kings Ball, Tri State Challenge, BYU Championship and many more competitions in the youth category.

After her partnership with Andrey ended, Demidova started dancing with Igor Mikushov, with whom she won many competitions such as the Ohio Star Ball, Emerald Ball, Manhattan DanceSport Championship, Tri State Championship, and San Francisco Open. They were also Blackpool Dance Festival Under 21 ballroom finalists, United Kingdom Open finalists, and International Championship grand finalists.

She was partnered with Michael Irvin for Season 9 of Dancing With the Stars. They were eliminated in the seventh week of the competition.

Demidova has since returned to competition, reuniting with Andrei Begunov, premiering at the Manhattan Dancesport Championships, debuting as professionals, placing second in Rising Star International Standard.
Practicing and teaching took up most of Demidova's time, but in her spare time she also took up modeling, which she had been doing since she moved to New York 5 years ago. Anna Demidova has also been outspoken about community issues and supporting many non-profits such as Dressed to Quilt. In 2016 she started investing more time in her acting career.

Achievements
International Grand Ball 10 Dance Champion
USA Dance National Standard Champion
Twice U.S. Youth International Standard Champion

References

Russian ballroom dancers
Russian female dancers
Russian emigrants to the United States
Living people
1988 births
Participants in American reality television series
21st-century Russian dancers